Gregers Fougner Lundh (15 May 1786 – 11 July 1836) was a Norwegian military officer and academic.

References

1786 births
1836 deaths
Norwegian Army personnel
Norwegian military personnel of the Napoleonic Wars